Trilogy International Partners, LLC is a public American wireless telecommunications company based in Bellevue, Washington.  It is listed on the Toronto Stock Exchange. Trilogy operates through its international partially-owned subsidiaries 2degrees in New Zealand  and Viva in Bolivia.

History 
Trilogy was founded in 2005 by John W. Stanton, an American wireless businessman, and several associates.  The founders previously managed Western Wireless, an American wireless operator, that merged with Alltel in 2005 for $6 billion.

Comcel Haiti, their company in Haiti, was sold to Digicel group in March 2012.  In 2015, Trilogy's Dominican Republic operations, Trilogy Dominicana (now Viva), were sold to Telemicro Group, a local firm.

In 2017, Trilogy listed on the Toronto Stock Exchange, through a take-over by a company on that exchange.  As part of this transaction, the company raised $270 million.

Business 
Trilogy owns two wireless telecommunications companies, 2degrees in New Zealand and Nuevatel in Bolivia.

2degrees is the third largest mobile provider in New Zealand, with 23% of the market as of 2017.  2degrees also provides fixed-line phone and broadband services, although it has a small market share for these services.  Trilogy has a 63% stake in 2degrees, with remaining owners including Tesbrit BV.

Nuevatel is the third largest mobile provider in Bolivia, with a 24% market share as of 2017.  Trilogy has a 72% interest in the company, the remaining 28% percent belongs to local telephone cooperative COMTECO.  Nuevatel operates under the brand name Viva.

Both companies are being sold in 2022. While Trilogy will only receive a "nominal" amount for Nuevatel, the company expects proceeds of NZD 930 million from the sale of its majority stake in 2degrees.

References

Companies listed on the Toronto Stock Exchange
Telecommunications companies of the United States
Companies based in Bellevue, Washington